The 2010–11 Idaho Vandals men's basketball team represented the University of Idaho during the 2010–11 NCAA Division I men's basketball season. The team played the first part of their season at Memorial Gym while waiting for the football season to end, and then played at the Cowan Spectrum in Moscow, Idaho. They were members of the Western Athletic Conference and were led by third-year head coach Don Verlin. They finished the season 18–14, 9–7 in WAC play. They lost in the quarterfinals of the 2011 WAC men's basketball tournament to San Jose State. They were invited to the 2011 CollegeInsider.com Tournament, where they lost in the first round to San Francisco.

Roster

Schedule

|-
!colspan=9| Regular Season

|-
!colspan=9| WAC tournament

|-
!colspan=9| CollegeInsider.com Tournament

References 

Idaho Vandals
Idaho
Idaho Vandals men's basketball seasons
Idaho
Idaho